Canistropsis burchellii is a species of flowering plant in the genus Canistropsis.

This bromeliad is endemic to the Atlantic Forest biome (Mata Atlantica Brasileira) within São Paulo (state), located in southeastern Brazil.

Cultivars and hybrids
 × Aechopsis 'Newk'
 × Neostropsis 'Fanfare'
 × Neostropsis 'Shadeball'

References

 
BSI Cultivar Registry Retrieved 11 October 2009

burchellii
Endemic flora of Brazil
Flora of São Paulo (state)
Flora of the Atlantic Forest